The County Farm Bridge is a historic stone arch bridge in Wilton, New Hampshire. Built in 1885, it carries Old County Farm over Whiting Brook, just south of its northern junction with Burton Highway in a rural section of northwestern Wilton. It is an unusually late and well-preserved example of a 19th-century stone arch bridge, and was listed on the National Register of Historic Places in 1981.

Description and history
Old County Farm Road was the main access road to the Hillsborough County Poor Farm, and is now an unmaintained class 6 road. The bridge consists of a single stone arch with a span just under .

The bridge was built in 1885 for the town by the Ward brothers of Lowell, Massachusetts, at a cost of $3,000. The Wards were well known for work they did on railroad bridges, which often employed stone arches. Stone for the bridge was quarried in Wilton, from a quarry that also supplied granite for public works projects in the town center. The bridge has been little altered since its construction: the arch was originally dry laid, but a number of joints in the barrel of the arch have subsequently been mortared with concrete.

See also

National Register of Historic Places listings in Hillsborough County, New Hampshire
List of bridges on the National Register of Historic Places in New Hampshire

References

Road bridges on the National Register of Historic Places in New Hampshire
Bridges completed in 1885
Bridges in Hillsborough County, New Hampshire
Wilton, New Hampshire
National Register of Historic Places in Hillsborough County, New Hampshire
Stone arch bridges in the United States
1885 establishments in New Hampshire